Anzhelika Barysevich (born ) is a Belarusian volleyball player, playing as a middle-blocker. She is part of the Belarus women's national volleyball team.

She competed at the 2015 Women's European Volleyball Championship. On club level she plays for Minchanka Minsk.

References

External links
https://web.archive.org/web/20171107093904/http://www.scoresway.com/?sport=volleyball&page=player&id=6519
http://www.cev.lu/Competition-Area/PlayerDetails.aspx?TeamID=8245&PlayerID=32707&ID=674
http://www.alamy.com/stock-photo-tatsiana-markevich-l-and-anzhelika-barysevich-c-of-belarus-in-action-60177338.html

1995 births
Living people
Belarusian women's volleyball players
Middle blockers